Ferguson House may refer to:

in the United States
(by state, then city/town)
 Ferguson House (Augusta, Arkansas), listed on the National Register of Historic Places (NRHP) in Woodruff County, Arkansas
 Ferguson-Calderara House, Fort Smith, AR, listed on the NRHP in Sebastian County, Arkansas
 T.M. Ferguson House, Marshall, AR, listed on the NRHP in Searcy County, Arkansas
 Zeb Ferguson House, Marshall, AR, listed on the NRHP in Searcy County, Arkansas
 Ferguson House (Pine Bluff, Arkansas), listed on the NRHP in Jefferson County, Arkansas
 Robert Ferguson House, Newark, DE, listed on the NRHP in New Castle County, Delaware
 Robert W. Ferguson House, Emathla, FL, listed on the NRHP in Marion County, Florida
 Benjamin Ferguson House, Charlestown, IN, listed on the NRHP in Clark County, Indiana
 Ferguson House (Logansport, Indiana), listed on the NRHP in Cass County, Indiana
 G.R. Ferguson, Sr. House, Leesville, LA, listed on the NRHP in Vernon Parish, Louisiana
 Charles W. Ferguson House, Webster Groves, MO, listed on the NRHP in St. Louis County, Missouri
 Ferguson House (Kalispell, Montana), listed on the NRHP in Flathead County, Montana
 William H. Ferguson House, Lincoln, NE, listed on the NRHP in Lancaster County, Nebraska
 John W. Ferguson House, Paterson, NJ, listed on the NRHP in Passaic County, New Jersey
 Dr. James Ferguson Office, Glens Falls, NY, listed on the NRHP in Warren County, New York
 Andrew Ferguson House, West Lafayette, OH, listed on the NRHP in Coshocton County, Ohio
 Ferguson House (Cache, Oklahoma), listed on the NRHP in Comanche County, Oklahoma
 Thompson Benton Ferguson House, Watonga, OK, listed on the NRHP in Blaine County, Oklahoma
 Albert W. Ferguson House, Astoria, OR, listed on the NRHP in Clatsop County, Oregon
 William Ferguson Farm, Glen Moore, PA, listed on the NRHP in Chester County, Pennsylvania
 James A. Ferguson House, Belton, TX, listed on the NRHP in Bell County, Texas
 James E. and Miriam Ferguson House, Belton, TX, listed on the NRHP in Bell County, Texas
 John H. Ferguson House, McKinney, TX, listed on the NRHP in Collin County, Texas
 Ferguson House (Temple, Texas), listed on the NRHP in Bell County, Texas
 Florence Ferguson House, Colfax, WA, listed on the NRHP in Whitman County, Washington